Nelson B. Tinnin (October 8, 1905 – August 13, 1985) was an American politician who served in the Missouri Senate from 1961 to 1985.

He died on August 13, 1985, in Memphis, Tennessee, at the age of 79.

References

1905 births
1985 deaths
Democratic Party Missouri state senators
20th-century American politicians